MAIA may refer to:

Japan Marine Accident Inquiry Agency
Multi-Angle Imager for Aerosols (MAIA), a NASA spacecraft mission